3x3 basketball at the 2013 Asian Youth Games was contested by 18 teams in the boys' tournament and 9 teams in the girls' tournament. All games were held at Nanjing, Jiangsu, China. The competition was held using the FIBA 33 ruleset developed by the sport's worldwide governing body, FIBA.

Medalists

Medal table

Results

Boys

Preliminary round

Group A

Group B

Group C

Group D

Final round

Quarterfinals

Classification (5–8)

Semifinals

Classification 7th–8th

Classification 5th–6th

Bronze medal game

Gold medal game

Girls

Preliminary round

Group A

Group B

Classification (5–8)

Classification 7th–8th

Classification 5th–6th

Final round

Semifinals

Bronze medal game

Gold medal game

References 

Boys Summary
Girls Summary

External links 
 Official website of the 2013 Asian Youth Games 
 Official website of the 2013 Asian Youth Games

Basketball at the Asian Youth Games
2013 in 3x3 basketball
basketball
International basketball competitions hosted by China
2013–14 in Asian basketball
2013–14 in Chinese basketball